Marat Azamatovich Khusnutdinov (born 17 July 2002) is a Russian ice hockey centre who plays for  SKA Saint Petersburg in the Kontinental Hockey League (KHL). He made his KHL debut for SKA Saint Petersburg during the 2020–21 season. Khusnutdinov was drafted by the Minnesota Wild in the second round of the 2020 NHL Entry Draft with the 37th pick overall.

Career statistics

Regular season and playoffs

International

References

External links
 

2002 births
Living people
Ice hockey people from Moscow
Minnesota Wild draft picks
Russian ice hockey centres
SKA-1946 players
SKA-Neva players
SKA Saint Petersburg players